Paulo Barros, (born 13 March 1989), is an Angolan professional basketball player who has represented his country internationally. Barros, who stands at 195 cm (6'5"), plays as a small forward.

Born in Caconda, Cabinda, Barros competed for the Angola national basketball team at the 2012 FIBA World Olympic Qualifying Tournament for Men. He played for the Atlético Petróleos de Luanda side that won silver in the 2012 FIBA Africa Clubs Champions Cup.

He currently plays for Angolan side Interclube at the Angolan basketball league BAI Basket.

References

External links
 2012 Olympic Qualifier profile
 RealGM Profile

1989 births
Living people
Angolan men's basketball players
Atlético Petróleos de Luanda basketball players
G.D. Interclube men's basketball players
Small forwards